Ministry of Transport, Construction and Maritime Economy was formed on 21 November 2011, from transformation of Ministry of Infrastructure.

The ministry was concerned with various aspects of transport in Poland, as well as construction and maritime economy.

The department was merged with the Ministry of Regional Development in November 2013 under Prime Minister Donald Tusk, creating the Ministry of Infrastructure and Development.

The ministry supervises:
 Central Office of Construction Supervision (Główny Urząd Nadzoru Budowlanego)
 General Directorate for National Roads and Highways (Generalna Dyrekcja Dróg Krajowych i Autostrad)
 Office of Rail Transport (Urząd Transportu Kolejowego)
 Road Transport Inspectorate (Inspekcja Transportu Drogowego)
 Civil Aviation Authority (Urząd Lotnictwa Cywilnego)
Dissolved in 2013.

Minister of Transport, Construction and Maritime Economy

Headquarters
The building of the Ministry of Communication is a modernist office building at 4/6 Tytusa Chałubińskiego Street in Warsaw, erected between 1929 and 1931, designed by Rudolf Świerczyński.

In the years 1948-1950 the complex of buildings was significantly expanded according to the design of Bohdan Pniewski. The high-rise part can be considered as the first skyscraper built in Warsaw, and probably in the whole country after World War II.

In the period 1945-2000 the Polish State Railways were also managed from this building.

References

External links
 Official website of Ministry of Transport, Construction and Maritime Economy

Poland, Transport, Construction and Marine Economy
Transport, Construction and Maritime Economy
Poland, Transport, Construction and Maritime Economy
Poland
Poland
Transport organisations based in Poland